The women's long jump event at the 1970 Summer Universiade was held at the Stadio Comunale in Turin on 2 and 3 September 1970.

Medalists

Results

Qualification

Final

References

Athletics at the 1970 Summer Universiade
1970